Montrose is a historic mansion in Holly Springs, Mississippi, United States.

Location
It is located at 335 East Salem Avenue in Holly Springs, a small town in Northern Mississippi.

History
The mansion was commissioned by Alfred Aaron Brooks (1802-1888), a plantation owner, as a wedding present for his daughter. It was completed in 1858. It was designed in the Greek Revival architectural style, as a two-storey mansion with red bricks and white Corinthian columns. Inside, there is a circular staircase with a niche.

Later, it was home to the Holly Springs Garden Club, with an arboretum on the grounds.

The house may be toured during the annual Annual Pilgrimage and Home Tour. The proceeds go towards the restoration of the mansion.

Architectural significance
As a contributing property to the East Holly Springs Historic District, it has been listed on the National Register of Historic Places since April 20, 1983. It has also been a Mississippi Landmark since 1986.

References

Buildings and structures in Holly Springs, Mississippi
Houses completed in 1858
Antebellum architecture
Greek Revival houses in Mississippi
Historic district contributing properties in Mississippi
National Register of Historic Places in Marshall County, Mississippi
Houses on the National Register of Historic Places in Mississippi